Amir Hossein Khozeimé-Alam (c. 1919 – 2002) was the eldest son of Amir Ma'soum Khan Khozeiméh (Hessamodolleh III), the last ruling Amir of Qaenat and Sistan, in what is now south-eastern Iran. He was a cousin of Amir Asadollah Alam and was married to Fatemé Alam, the eldest daughter of Amir Ebrahim Alam (Shokat ol-molk II), who was also his great-uncle.

Subsequently, he became Under-secretary for Agriculture in Tehran. Hussein and Fateme had two sons and two daughters, of whom the eldest is married to the British politician Lord Temple-Morris. After the Iranian revolution, Khozeimé-Alam fled into exile in London where he was a leading figure in the Iranian community.

References

2002 deaths
Iranian Vice Ministers
Exiles of the Iranian Revolution in the United Kingdom
Year of birth uncertain
Alumni of the University of Bristol
Iranian emigrants to the United Kingdom